Tier 2 may refer to:

 Tier 2 capital, constituents of a bank's capital requirement
 Tier 2 network, a type of Internet service provider 
 Scaled Composites Tier Two, a human spaceflight program
 Tier 2 in the First COVID-19 tier regulations in England, the middle level
 Tier 2 in the Second COVID-19 tier regulations in England
 Tier II, a data center standard
 Tier II, in United States vehicle emission standards

See also
 Two-tier healthcare
 Multitier architecture
 WTA Tier II tournaments, Women's Tennis Association tennis second-level tournaments
 Three-tier system (disambiguation)
 Tier 1 (disambiguation)
 Tier 3 (disambiguation)
 Tier 4 (disambiguation)
 Tier II+, a remotely-piloted, surveillance aircraft